The Adventures of Leucippe and Clitophon (ta kata Leukippēn kai Kleitophōnta), written by Achilles Tatius, is one of the five surviving Ancient Greek romances, notable for its many similarities to Longus' Daphnis and Chloe, and its apparent mild parodic nature.

Plot summary

An unnamed narrator is approached by a young man called Clitophon (Kleitophōn) who is induced to talk of his adventures.  In Clitophon's story, his cousin Leucippe (Leukippē) travels to his home in Tyre, at which point he falls in love with Leucippe, despite his already being promised in marriage to his half-sister Calligone.  He seeks the advice of another cousin (Kleinias), already experienced in love (this latter's young male lover dies shortly after).  Following a number of attempts to woo her, Clitophon wins Leucippe's love, but his marriage to Calligone is fast approaching.  However, the marriage is averted when Kallisthenes, a young man from Byzantium who has heard of Leucippe's beauty, comes to Tyre to kidnap her, but by mistake kidnaps Calligone.

Clitophon attempts to visit Leucippe at night in her room, but her mother is awakened by an ominous dream. Fearing reprisals, Clitophon and Leucippe elope and leave Tyre on a ship (where they meet another unhappy lover, Menelaos, responsible for his own boyfriend's death).  Unfortunately, their ship is wrecked during a storm.  They come to Egypt and are captured by Nile delta bandits.  Clitophon is rescued, but the bandits sentence Leucippe to be sacrificed.  Clitophon witnesses this supposed sacrifice and goes to commit suicide on Leucippe's grave, but it in fact turns out that she is still alive, the sacrifice having been staged by his captured friends using theatrical props.

The Egyptian army soon rescues the group, but the general leading them falls in love with Leucippe. Leucippe is stricken by a state of madness, the effect of a strange love potion given her by another rival, but is saved by an antidote given by the helpful stranger Chaireas.  The bandits' camp is destroyed and the lovers and their friends make for Alexandria, but are again betrayed: Chaireas kidnaps Leucippe, taking her away on his boat.  As Clitophon pursues them, Chaireas' men apparently chop off her head and throw her overboard.

Clitophon, distraught, returns to Alexandria.  Melite, a widowed lady from Ephesus, falls in love with him and convinces him to marry her. Clitophon refuses to consummate the marriage before they arrive in Ephesus.  Once there, he discovers Leucippe, who is still alive, another woman having been decapitated in her stead.  It turns out that Melite's husband Thersandros is also still alive; he returns home and attempts to both rape Leucippe and frame Clitophon for adultery and murder.

Eventually, Clitophon's innocence is proven; Leucippe proves her virginity by entering the magical grotto of Pan, behind the temple of Artemis; Leucippe's father (Sostratos) comes to Ephesus and reveals that Clitophon's father gives the lovers his blessing.  Kallisthenes, Calligone's kidnapper, is also shown to have become a true and honest husband.  The lovers can finally marry in Byzantium, Leucippe's town.

Analysis 

The papyrus, and linguistic evidence demonstrate it was composed early in the 2nd century CE.

The first appraisal of this work comes from Photius' Bibliotheca, where we find: "the diction and composition are excellent, the style distinct, and the figures of speech, whenever they are employed, are well adapted to the purpose. The periods as a rule are aphoristic, clear and agreeable, and soothing to the ear". To this Photius added a moralistic bias that would long persecute the author: "the obscenity and impurity of sentiment impair his judgment, are prejudicial to seriousness, and make the story disgusting to read or something to be avoided altogether." Past scholars have passed scathing comments on the work, as in the 1911 Encyclopædia Britannica  which brands the novel's style artificial and labored, full of incidents "highly improbable", and whose characters "fail to enlist sympathy". Today's judgements tend to be more favorable, valuing the elements of originality that the author introduces in the genre of the romance.

The most striking of these elements may be the abandonment of the omniscient narrator, dominant in the ancient romance, for a first person narration. To this is added the use of ekphrasis: the novel opens with an admirable description of a painting of the rape of Europa, and also includes descriptions of other paintings such as Andromeda being saved by Perseus and Prometheus being liberated by Heracles. The story, we are told, is inspired by this image, but is not based on it, in contrast to Daphnis and Chloe, a romance which also opens with an ekphrasis, but instead of being inspired by the painting is in fact an interpretation of the painting, making the whole novel a form of ekphrasis.

Achilles Tatius takes pleasure in asides and digressions on mythology and the interpretation of omens, descriptions of exotic beasts (crocodiles, hippopotami) and sights (the Nile delta, Alexandria), and discussions of amorous matters (such as kisses, or whether women or boys make better lovers).  His descriptions of confused and contradictory emotional states (fear, hope, shame, jealousy, and desire) are exemplary ("baroque" conceits such as these would be frequently imitated in the Renaissance). There are also several portrayals of almost sadistic cruelty (Leucippe's fake sacrifice and, later, decapitation; Clitophon chained in prison or beaten by Melite's husband) that share much with Hellenistic sculpture (such as the "Dying Gaul" or the "Laocoön and his Sons").

The romance's modern editions

The large number of existing manuscripts attests the novel's popularity. A part of it was first printed in a Latin translation by Annibale Della Croce (Crucejus), in Lyon, 1544; his complete translation appeared in Basel in 1554. The first edition of the Greek original appeared in Heidelberg, 1601, printed together with similar works of Longus and Parthenius; another edition was published by Claudius Salmasius in Leiden, 1640, with commentary. The first important critical edition came out with Friedrich Jacobs in Leipzig, 1821.

There are translations in many languages. The first English translation was William Burton's The Most Delectable and Pleasaunt History of Clitiphon and Leucippe, first published in 1597 and reprinted in 1923, when only 394 copies were printed. it was followed by those of Anthony Hodges (1638), R. Smith (1855), Stephen Gaselee (1917), J. J. Winkler (1989), and Tim Whitmarsh (2001).

A first partial French translation (most likely based on the Latin edition) appeared in 1545 by Philibert de Vienne. The first complete French translation was published in 1568 by François de Belleforest.

In 2005 a Portuguese translation, Os Amores de Leucipe e Clitofonte, was published as part of the Labirintos de Eros book series of translations of ancient Greek novels which was issued by Edições Cosmos of Lisbon. That translation was made by Abel Nascimento Pena, a professor of classics at the University of Lisbon, and included a preface by Marília Pulquério Futre Pinheiro.

Influence
Literary parallels have been found between Leucippe and Clitophon and the Christian Acts of Andrew, which are roughly contemporary  compositions.

A copy of Leucippe and Clitophon was held in the extensive library of the Byzantine provincial magnate Eustathios Boilas in the eleventh century.

Leucippe and Clitophon is the key source for The Story of Hysmine and Hysminias, by the 12th century AD Greek author Eustathius Macrembolites  (or Eumathius). This book was frequently translated in the Renaissance.

Leucippe and Clitophon is also imitated in Historia de los amores de Clareo y Florisea by the Spanish writer Alonso Nuñez de Reinoso (Venice, 1552). This novel was translated into French as Les Amours de Florisee et Clareo et de la peu fortunee Ysea by Jacques Vincent (Paris, 1554).

A French adaptation of Achilles Tatius' novel (with significant changes) was published as Les adventureuses et fortunees amours de Pandion et d’Yonice (1599) by Jean Herembert, sieur de la Rivière.

Notes

References

 "Achilleus Statios" in the Suda 
 Del Corno, Dario; Letteratura greca (1988)
 Photius, Bibliotheca, J.H. Freese (translator) (1920) 
 Smith, William; Dictionary of Greek and Roman Biography and Mythology, "Achilles Tatius", Boston, (1867)
 Leucippe and Clitophon, complete Greek text

External links
 A detailed synopsis of the plot of Leucippe and Clitophon by Samuel Lee Wolff (1912)
Achilles Tatius Full English translation of Leucippe and Clitophon edited by Stephen Gaselee, 1917 (Greek and English on opposite pages, full book for free).
Leucippe and Clitophon Greek text edited by Fridericus Iacobs, pp. 1,175, publ. Leipzig, 1821. Incl. a Latin translation, a summary of the plot in Latin, and extensive notes.
Clitophon and Leucippe A short study of Achilles Tatius' romance. It appeared in Blackwood's Edinburgh Magazine, vol. 55, no. 339, January 1844, pp. 33–44.
Clitophon and Leucippe Erotici Scriptores ed. G. A. Hirschig, pp. 739. Paris, 1856. Greek text of Clitophon and Leucippe with a Latin translation in parallel columns in Volume 1, pp. 70–170.

Ancient Greek novels
2nd-century novels